Baron Joicey, of Chester-le-Street in the County of Durham, is a title in the Peerage of the United Kingdom. It was created in 1906 for the coal mining magnate and former Liberal Member of Parliament for Chester-le-Street, Sir James Joicey, 1st Baronet. He had already been created a baronet, of Longhirst and of Ulgham, both in the County of Northumberland, in the Baronetage of the United Kingdom in 1893. He was succeeded by his eldest son, the second Baron. He was High Sheriff of County Durham in 1910. The second baron lost his son young, and on his death his younger brother succeeded to the barony. The third Baron was an army officer, whose elder son died in WWII without male issue, and he was thus succeeded by his younger son, the fourth baron.  the titles are held by the latter's eldest son, the fifth Baron, who succeeded in 1993.

John Joicey, uncle of the first Baron, was a Liberal politician and coal owner.

The family seat is Etal Manor on the Ford Castle and Etal Castle estate.

Barons Joicey (1906)
James Joicey, 1st Baron Joicey (1846–1936)
 James Arthur Joicey, 2nd Baron Joicey (1880–1940) Died 24 July 1940
 Hugh Edward Joicey, 3rd Baron Joicey (1881–1966), second son of the first Baron.
 Michael Edward Joicey, 4th Baron Joicey (1925–1993)
 James Michael Joicey, 5th Baron Joicey (born 1953)

The heir apparent is the present holder's son the Hon. William James Joicey (born 1990)

Notes

References

Book cited

Kidd, Charles, Williamson, David (editors). Debrett's Peerage and Baronetage (1990 edition). New York: St Martin's Press, 1990, 

Baronies in the Peerage of the United Kingdom
Noble titles created in 1906
Noble titles created for UK MPs